Vanessa Polster Bayer (born November 14, 1981) is an American actress and comedian. Bayer is most notable for being a cast member on the NBC sketch comedy series Saturday Night Live from 2010 to 2017, which earned her an Emmy nomination. Outside of SNL, she co-created, co-executive produces, and has the lead role in the Showtime comedy I Love That for You, which is loosely based on her experience as a survivor of childhood leukemia.  Bayer has also appeared in such films as Trainwreck (2015), Office Christmas Party (2016), Carrie Pilby (2016), Ibiza (2018), and Wander Darkly (2020).

Early life
Bayer was born in Orange, Ohio, a suburb of Cleveland, and raised in nearby Moreland Hills. She is the daughter of Carolyn and Todd Bayer. Bayer's family is Jewish, and she has stated that her Jewish upbringing "influenced [her] life and comedy". She has a brother, Jonah, who is a music journalist and the guitarist of the punk supergroup United Nations.

At age 15, she was diagnosed with acute lymphoblastic leukemia (ALL). Bayer stated that while battling the disease, she discovered the meaning of comic relief. "I don't know if it made me funnier, but it was so amazing, how it made everything be O.K.", she said.

Bayer is a 2000 graduate of Orange High School. In 2004, she graduated from the Annenberg School for Communication of the University of Pennsylvania, where she majored in communication and French.

While attending college, Bayer interned on the television shows Sesame Street and Late Night with Conan O'Brien and participated in the cast of Bloomers, an all-female musical and sketch comedy troupe.

Career
, Bayer was collaborating with her brother Jonah on the web series mSound Advice for Above Average. Bayer stars as Janessa Slater, a media coach who helps famous musicians change their image. She was part of the all-Jewish cast of The Second City's stage show Jewsical: The Musical, a musical that presented a comedic take on Jewish life and culture. She played the role of Kate Clark in the Chicago-based feature comedy Off the Cuff. Bayer performed improvisational comedy at Chicago's ImprovOlympic, where she trained with SNL castmate Paul Brittain as well as the Annoyance Theatre and The Second City.

Saturday Night Live
Bayer joined the cast of Saturday Night Live as a featured player on September 25, 2010. Beginning with the 2012–2013 season, Bayer was promoted to repertory status. In 2014, she was nominated for an American Comedy Award for her work on the show, and in 2017, she was nominated for a Primetime Emmy Award for Outstanding Supporting Actress in a Comedy Series. Bayer departed SNL on May 20, 2017, after seven years on the show.

Her recurring characters included:
 Laura Parsons, a child actress always performing roles originally played by adults, including from Forrest Gump, The Wolf of Wall Street, Brokeback Mountain and Dallas Buyers Club
 Brecky, a former porn star who creates homemade commercials to obtain free luxury items alongside Cecily Strong
 Rebecca Stern-Markowicz, a co-host of J-Pop America Fun Time Now, which celebrates Japanese culture alongside Taran Killam and Jason Sudeikis
 Rosa, a housemaid, in "The Californians"
 Miss Meadows, an unrealistically perky poetry teacher trying to connect with her delinquent students
 Miley Cyrus (impersonation), on "The Miley Cyrus Show"
 An unnamed director of talk show Mornin' Miami
 Jacob the Bar Mitzvah Boy, who appears on Weekend Update to perform a rehearsed speech with forced jokes about a given subject
 One of three workshop elves who perform their jobs poorly in the hope that their master will "punish" them, alongside Kenan Thompson
 Dawn Lazarus, an inept meteorologist who appears on Weekend Update and struggles to discuss the weather
 The housewife who feeds her "hungry guys" Totinos.

Post-SNL career
Bayer appeared on ABC's Single Parents in 2019 in a recurring role as Mia Cooper, the ex-wife of Taran Killam's character.

Starting in 2018, she had a recurring role on NBC's Will & Grace playing Amy, a former baker who loses her job because of Karen and subsequently works for Karen's baseball team.

Bayer is the co-creator, co-executive producer, and star of the Showtime comedy I Love That for You, which premiered on May 1, 2022, and is loosely based on Bayer's life as a survivor of childhood leukemia.

Philanthropy
After Bayer was diagnosed with leukemia as a teenager, the Make-A-Wish Foundation granted her wish to send her family on vacation to Hawaii. In gratitude and recognition, Bayer  is involved with the foundation. In 2015, she hosted the foundation's Evening of Wishes Dinner to help raise funds for wishes for children with life-threatening illnesses.

In June 2019, she published the children's book How Do You Care for a Very Sick Bear?, which teaches children how to support friends with long-term illnesses.

Filmography

Film

Television

References

External links
 
 

1981 births
Living people
People from Cuyahoga County, Ohio
Actresses from Cleveland
Comedians from Ohio
American film actresses
American television actresses
American women comedians
American sketch comedians
American impressionists (entertainers)
American voice actresses
Jewish American female comedians
Jewish American actresses
Jewish American comedy writers
Annenberg School for Communication at the University of Pennsylvania alumni
20th-century American Jews
21st-century American Jews
21st-century American actresses
21st-century American comedians